Frösöstenen (J RS1928;66 $) is the northernmost raised runestone in Scandinavia and Jämtland's only runestone. It originally stood at the tip of ferry terminal on the sound between the island of Frösön and Östersund.

On it is inscribed:
Austmaðr, Guðfastr's son, had this stone raised and this bridge built and Christianized Jämtland. Ásbjörn built the bridge. Trjónn and Steinn carved these runes.

The following Old Norse person and place names appear in the inscription:
 Austmaðr - An Old West Norse speaking man from Mainland Scandinavia. Similarly, Vestmaðr (English: Man from the West) was an Old West Norse-speaking Briton.
 Guðfastr (English: He who is faithful to God)
 Jamtaland (English: Land of the "Jamtar"- The Old Norse name for Jämtland where jamti may mean 'hard-working person'; cf. German adjective emsig 'hard-working'.)
 Ásbjörn (English: God Bear)
 Trjónn - (English: Snout - A name more or less specific to Jämtland, and also found in several Medieval documents from Jämtland)
 Steinn (English: Stone)

The stone is also unique in that it was done in memory of Austmaðr's Christianization of Jämtland and bridge building, rather than as a cenotaph. The stone dates to between 1030 and 1050. It has now been relocated to the lawn in front of the local county seat due to the construction of a new bridge, between 1969 and 1971, on the original site.

See also
Arnljot
Christianization of Scandinavia
Joint Nordic database for runic inscriptions
List of runestones
Runestone
Runic alphabet

Footnotes

References

External links
The runestone on Frösön
Aksel
"Jämtlands runsten" Bo Oscarsson

Runestones in Jämtland
11th-century inscriptions